FERM and PDZ domain containing 4 is a protein that in humans is encoded by the FRMPD4 gene.

Function

This gene encodes a multi-domain (WW, PDZ, FERM) containing protein. Through its interaction with other proteins (such as PSD-95), it functions as a positive regulator of dendritic spine morphogenesis and density, and is required for the maintenance of excitatory synaptic transmission.

References

Further reading 

Human proteins